Sankt Margarethen an der Raab is a municipality in the district of Weiz in the Austrian state of Styria.

Geography
The municipality lies in the Raab valley.

References

External links 
 Official website

Cities and towns in Weiz District